The Heinkel He 70 Blitz ("lightning") was a German mail plane and fast passenger monoplane aircraft of the 1930s designed by  Heinkel Flugzeugwerke, which was later used as a bomber and for aerial reconnaissance. It had a brief commercial career before it was replaced by larger types. The He 70 had set eight world speed records by the beginning of 1933.

Design and development
The Heinkel He 70 Blitz (Lightning) was designed in the early 1930s as a mailplane for Deutsche Lufthansa in response to a request for an aircraft faster than the Lockheed Model 9 Orion (used by Swissair) to service short routes.

It had a cantilever low-wing monoplane, with an aerodynamically efficient elliptical wing and retractable undercarriage, and a single, nose-mounted engine.

To meet the demanding speed requirements, care was taken to minimize drag, with flush rivets giving a smooth surface, and fully retractable main landing gear. The tail wheel was not retractable. It was powered by a  BMW VI V-12 engine cooled with ethylene glycol rather than water. This allowed a smaller radiator to be used, which also retracted at high speed to further reduce drag. The pilot and radio operator were seated in tandem, followed by a cabin seating four passengers in pairs facing each other.

Operational history
Luft Hansa operated He 70s between 1934 and 1937 for a fast flight service which connected Berlin with Frankfurt, Hamburg and Cologne, as well as between Cologne and Hamburg.

He 70s were flown abroad from Stuttgart to Seville between 1934 and 1936. The route was part of the South America mail service provided by Luft Hansa that continued via Bathurst, The Gambia to Natal, Brazil, using Junkers Ju 52/3m and Dornier Wal flying boats.

Remaining aircraft were transferred to the Luftwaffe in 1937.

Military use

The Luftwaffe operated He 70s from 1935, initially as a light bomber and reconnaissance aircraft. As soon as purpose built designs became available, it was relegated to use as a liaison and courier aircraft.

Twenty-eight aircraft were sent in the late 1930s to Spain with the German-manned Legion Condor, where they were used during the Spanish Civil War as fast reconnaissance aircraft. There they were known as the Rayo, Spanish for "lightning".

He 170

The He 70K (later given the RLM number: He 170) was a fast reconnaissance airplane export variant used by the Hungarian air force. Powered by a Gnome-Rhône Mistral Major radial engine, the engines were built under license in Hungary as the WM-K-14, but the air frame and final assembly were in Germany.

Weaknesses

A major weakness of the He 70 in military use was the fire risk. Parts of the airframe were made out of an extremely flammable magnesium alloy called "Elektron", though the majority of the monocoque fuselage was Duralumin. Elektron is very light yet strong, but burns readily when ignited and is difficult to extinguish. Moreover, each wing contained a non-self-sealing  fuel tank, which may have further added to the aircraft's reputation for catching fire. 
Other problems included poor defensive armament, short range and poor view from the cabin, all of which led to the Hungarian He 170A fleet being prematurely retired and replaced with obsolescent Heinkel He 46 parasol-wing monoplanes, until Focke-Wulf Fw 189 "Uhu" medium altitude observation aircraft could be introduced.

Influence

While the He 70 saw only limited service in training capacities during World War II, it was the Luftwaffe's first Schnellbomber and served as the antecedent for some of the bombers involved in the Battle of Britain.

German designs
The He 70 is known mainly as the ancestor to the Heinkel He 111, which had similar elliptical wings and streamlined fuselage in a twin-engined configuration. The He 111, which began service with the Luftwaffe in 1936, went on to become the most numerous bomber type of the Luftwaffe – with just over 5,600 examples produced during the war in total – in the early years of World War II.

The He 70 was essentially scaled down to produce the He 112 fighter which lost out on competition against the Messerschmitt Bf 109, but was nonetheless built in small numbers.

Japanese designs
An He 70 was exported to Japan for study and inspired the Aichi D3A ("Val") carrier-launched light bomber. This aircraft shared the He 70's distinctive, low-mounted elliptical wing.

British designs
Beverley Shenstone, R.J. Mitchell's aerodynamic advisor denied that the Spitfire wing was copied from the He 70. Shenstone said:

The Günther brothers had already used an elliptical wing for the Bäumer Sausewind sports aircraft before they joined Heinkel.

Shenstone said that the He 70's influence on the Spitfire design was limited to use as a benchmark for aerodynamic smoothness.

Variants
He 70a
First prototype.
He 70b
Second prototype with the crew of 2 and 4 seats for passengers.
He 70c
Third prototype armed with machine gun for trials of versions for light bomber, reconnaissance and courier duties.
He 70d
Fourth prototype built in 1934 for Luft Hansa, powered by BMW VI 7,3 engine.
He 70e
Fifth prototype built in 1934 for Luftwaffe as light bomber, powered by BMW VI 7,3 engine.
He 70A
Passenger version for Luft Hansa.
He 70D
Passenger version for Luft Hansa, 12 examples built.
He 70E
Light bomber version for Luftwaffe, later converted to F version.
He 70F
Reconnaissance / courier version for Luftwaffe.
He 70F-1
Long-range reconnaissance version.
He 70F-2
Similar to the He 70F-1
He 70G
Passenger version built for Luft Hansa, after 1937 converted to F version.
He 70G-1
One aircraft fitted with a  Rolls-Royce Kestrel piston engine.
He 70K (He 170A)
Military variant equipped with a licence-built  WM-K-14 radial engine.
He 270 V1 (W.Nr. 1973, D-OEHF)
Prototype with DB-601Aa inline engine.

Operators

Civil operators

 Deutsche Luft Hansa received the first two prototypes in 1933 and 1934, and three He 70Ds in 1934 and 10 He 70Gs in 1935.

Imperial Japanese Navy Air Service received one aircraft for testing.

Swissair received a few Heinkel He 70s for express transalpine flights between Zurich and Milan in 1934.

Rolls-Royce acquired one He 70G from the RLM in exchange for four Kestrel engines. It was used as an engine testbed.

Military operators

Luftwaffe
 Hungary
The Royal Hungarian Air Force received 18 He 170A aircraft from Germany, powered with licence-built engines.

Ejército del Aire received 11 of the 30 aircraft that had served with the Legion Condor.

Specifications (He 70F-2)

See also

References

Notes

Bibliography
 Donald, David (ed.) The Encyclopedia of Civil Aircraft. London:Aurum Publishing. 1999. .
 Green, William and Gordon Swanborough. "The Beautiful Blitz". Air International, January 1991, Vol 40 No 1. Stamford, UK:Key Publishing. pp. 25–33. ISSN 0306-5634.
 Nowarra, Heinz. Heinkel He111 A Documentary History. Jane's Publishing Co Ltd. 1980. .
 Smith, J.R. and Kay, A.L. German Aircraft of the Second World War. London: Putnam. 1972. .
 Price, Alfred. Spitfire: A Documentary History. London: Macdonald and Jane's, 1977. .
 Townend, David, R. Thunderbolt & Lightning—The History of Aeronautical Namesakes. AeroFile Publications. 2009. .
Green, William. "Warplanes of the Second World War – Bombers and Reconnaissance Aircraft, Volume Nine" Macdonald: London, 1967.

Low-wing aircraft
1930s German mailplanes
1930s German military reconnaissance aircraft
He 070
Single-engined tractor aircraft
Aircraft first flown in 1932